The Multiusos Ciudad de Cáceres is a multi-purpose sports arena located in Cáceres, Extremadura, Spain. It has a capacity of 6,550 spectators.

The arena was constructed due to the need of a new arena for the Liga ACB games of Cáceres CB. Financed by the Extremadura Government, it cost 800 million pesetas.

Finally, it was opened on September 9, 1999, in a Liga ACB game against Adecco Estudiantes.

External links
 Profile at Cáceres City Hall website

Indoor arenas in Spain
Basketball venues in Spain
Sports venues in Extremadura
Sport in Cáceres, Spain
Buildings and structures in Cáceres, Spain